Trépail is a commune in the Marne department in north-eastern France. It had a population of 436 in 2019. Its inhabitants are referred to as Trépaillots and Trépaillotes in French.

Geography 
Trépail is located at the southeastern foot of the Montagne de Reims. The stream Ruisseau de Trépail runs through the village, and empties into the Aisne-Marne Canal at Vaudemange. The commune of Trépail covers an area of 8.37 km2.

Vineyards 
Trépail is most famously known for its vast vineyards. The vineyards in Trépail  are dominated by Chardonnay. Trépail shares the Chardonnay dominance with three of its neighbouring villages: Vaudemagne and Billy-le-Grand just below the slope, and Villers-Marmery, located to the north/northeast along the slope. This area is sometimes called the Perle blanche, and Trépail is probably the most well-known village of the area. The current vineyard surface in the Trépail commune is just under 700 acres. As of 2013, it is made up of about 90% Chardonnay and 10% Pinot Noir (9.5%).

See also
Communes of the Marne department
Montagne de Reims Regional Natural Park

References

Communes of Marne (department)